Nis, Niš, NiS or NIS may refer to:

Places
 Niš, a city in Serbia
 Nis, Iran, a village
 Ness, Lewis, a village in the Outer Hebrides islands

Businesses and organizations
 Naftna Industrija Srbije, Petroleum Industry of Serbia
 Nagoya International School
 Nanjing International School
 National Institute of Sports, India
 , railway company in the Dutch East Indies
 Nippon Ichi Software, a video game developer
 Norwegian International Ship Register,
 Nuclear Information Service, independent UK organisation

Military, intelligence and security
 National Intelligence Service (disambiguation), abbreviated NIS in some countries
 National Intelligence Service (Greece)
 National Intelligence Service (South Africa), former agency
 National Intelligence Service (South Korea)
 Norwegian Intelligence Service
 Naval Investigative Service, later Naval Criminal Investigative Service, U.S.
 Canadian Forces National Investigation Service (CFNIS; sometimes abbreviated to NIS)

Science and technology

Chemistry and biology
 Nickel sulfide (chemical symbol NiS)
 N-Iodosuccinimide, a reagent
 Sodium-iodide symporter, a protein

Computing
 Network Information Service, directory service protocol
 Network information system
 NIS Directive, the EU Directive on Security of Network and Information Systems

Other uses
 National innovation system
 New Israeli Shekel (unofficial abbreviation), the currency of Israel
 Niš (boat), a sunk Yugoslav ferry
 Nordic Integrated System, for ski binding 
 Johnson (rapper) (born 1979), Danish rapper previously known as NiggerenISlæden (N.I.S.)

See also